The Königsangerspitze is a mountain in the Sarntal Alps in South Tyrol, Italy.
Until the 19th century it was also known as Mount Rodella.

References 

 Hanspaul Menara: Südtiroler Gipfelwanderungen. Athesia, Bozen 2001, 
 Freytag & Berndt-Verlag Wien, Wanderkarte 1:50.000, Blatt WKS 4, Sterzing – Brixen, 
 Topografische Wanderkarte, Bressanone / Brixen, Blatt 030, 1:25.000, Casa Editrice Tabacco,

External links 

Mountains of the Alps
Mountains of South Tyrol
Sarntal Alps